Murray F. Tuley was born in Louisville, Kentucky in 1827. He was a veteran of the Mexican–American War. Tuley became a judge, one of the best known jurists in the West.  Tuley was known as the "Nestor" of the Chicago bench. He was president of the Illinois State Bar Association 1902-1903. He was married to Katherine E. Tuley.

After his election in 1871, Chicago Mayor Joseph Medill tasked Tuley with creating a bill to be passed in the Illinois General Assembly to revise Chicago's City Charter to expand the power of the mayor. This bill was successfully passed, and as a reward Medill appointed Tuley the city's corporation counsel.

From 1878 through 1879, Tuley served as a Chicago alderman from the 1st ward of the city.

The Northwest Division High School in Chicago was renamed in 1917 to Murray F. Tuley High School, after Judge Murray F. Tuley who had risen to fame not only as a judge, but as the author of the State of Illinois's Act of the Incorporation of Cities.

M.F. Tuley owned a farm on Pine Lake which is now in Chenequa, Wisconsin. There is a spring on the property and for a period of time, he sold bottle water through the Che Ne Qua Co.(see advertisement in cookbook) His farm was later sold and Became Wilson's Chenequa Springs Hotel and was later sold to Jacob Elias Friend. This land is of historical significance because it was known muskrat hunting ground of the Prairie Potawatomi (Mashko-tens) Menomini and Chippewa Indians. The area is referred to as Tuley's Bay and also Wilson's Bay where there is reedy marsh extending from opposite the Chenequa hotel property southward across the bay to the wooded Niedecken point. The Indians called the springs, "Tkepmbes" or "springs at the lakes."

He served two years as attorney general for the New Mexico Territory, and one term in that territory's legislature.

Personal life
Murray Tuley was married to Katherine E. Tuley. She also went by the names: Kate Tuley, Kate E. Tuley, Mrs. M. F. Tuley, Katherine Edmonson, and Mrs. Murray F. Tuley.

She is known for assistance in establishing kindergarten in the public school system in Chicago, Illinois. She did this through her involvement in the Chicago Women's Club of which she was a charter member. She secured aid through the Froebel Kindergarten Association. to help fund Arnold Street Free Kindergarten, May 21, 1884  and was a member of the Froebel Kindergarten Association Executive Committee.

She founded the School Children's Aid Society in 1889 after law on compulsory education was enacted.

In 1893 she was a member of Kindergarten Congress.

Death
He died in the Pennoyer Sanitarium in Kenosha, Wisconsin in 1905. His death was attributed to nervous exhaustion, the result of overwork. Tuley Park in Chicago and Tuley High School were named after Judge Tuley.

References

 Middletown Daily Press, Middletown, New York, December 26, 1905, Page 5.
 http://www.tuley.us/TuleyNew/b128.htm#P131

1827 births
1905 deaths
Lawyers from Louisville, Kentucky
Lawyers from Chicago
People from Chenequa, Wisconsin
Illinois state court judges
American military personnel of the Mexican–American War
19th-century American judges
Chicago City Council members